

Events

Europe
October 14 - Woodes Rogers returns to England after a successful round-the-world privateering cruise against Spain, carrying loot worth £150,000.  Broils with the Admiralty courts delay distribution of the treasure.

Deaths

Piracy
Piracy by year
1711 in military history